Citerna is a comune (municipality) in the Province of Perugia in the Italian region Umbria, located about 50 km northwest of Perugia.

It has recently been noted for its beauty, as one of the winning villages in the 'Borghi più Belli d'Italia' (most beautiful villages in Italy) award

References

External links
 www.citerna.net/

Cities and towns in Umbria